Budapest Short-faced Tumblers are a breed of fancy pigeon developed over many years of selective breeding. The breed was created in Budapest, Hungary. Budapest Short-faced Tumblers, along with other varieties of domesticated pigeons, are all descendants of the rock dove (Columba livia).

See also 
List of pigeon breeds

References

Pigeon breeds
Pigeon breeds originating in Hungary